The 6th Filipino Academy of Movie Arts and Sciences Awards Night was held on March 15, 1958, at Fiesta Pavilion of the historical Manila Hotel. This is for the Outstanding Achievements in films for the year 1957.

Kalibre .45 a film directed by Cesar Gallardo under Premiere Productions was the most nominated (8 nominations) and the most awarded  (5 wins) film of FAMAS 1958  including the FAMAS Award for Best Picture.

Awards

Major Awards
Winners are listed first and highlighted with boldface.

Special Awardee

International Prestige Award of Merit 
Anak Dalita (LVN Pictures)

References

External links
FAMAS Awards 

FAMAS Award
FAMAS
FAMAS